The 1994 Russian Figure Skating Championships took place in Saint Petersburg. Skaters competed in the disciplines of men's singles, ladies' singles, pair skating, and ice dancing. The results were one of the criteria used to pick the Russian teams to the 1994 World Championships and the 1994 European Championships.

Senior results

Men

Ladies

Pairs

Ice dancing

External links
 pairs on ice

Russian Figure Skating Championships, 1994
Russian Figure Skating Championships
1994 in Russian sport